Umm Ebairiya is a village in Qatar, located in the municipality of Umm Salal.

In the 2015 census, it was listed as a district of Zone 71, which has a population of 90,835 and also includes all of Umm Salal's other administrative districts. 

It borders Umm Al Amad to the east, Umm Salal Ali to the southeast and Saina Al-Humaidi to the northeast.

Etymology
"Umm" means mother in Arabic and is commonly used as a prefix for geographical features. The second component, "ebairiya", comes from "obri", the local name of a plant that grows abundantly in the region.

Alternative transliterations of the name include Umm ‘Ubayrīyah, Umm Obairiya, Umm A'birieh and Umm Abiriyah.

References

Populated places in Umm Salal